The 2009 U.S. Women's Open was the 64th U.S. Women's Open. Held July 9–12, it was the first U.S. Women's Open to be played at the Old Course of the Saucon Valley Country Club in Upper Saucon Township, Pennsylvania. Eun-Hee Ji won her only major title, one stroke ahead of runner-up Candie Kung. The event was televised by ESPN and NBC Sports.

Na Yeon Choi shot a 68 (−3) in the first round to take a one-shot lead. Cristie Kerr led the way after the second round after shooting a one-under par 70 for 139 (−3). Top-ranked Lorena Ochoa struggled to a second round 79 (+8) and was nine strokes back at 148 (+6). The 36-hole cut was at 151 (+9) or better, which included seven amateurs among the 72 players who advanced to the weekend. In the third round, Kerr shot 72 (+1) for 211 (−2) and kept the lead, two strokes up on the field after 54 holes.

Ji won the championship after sinking a  birdie putt on the 72nd hole to finish with an even-par 71 and 284, one stroke ahead of runner-up Kung. Ji held off the challenge of playing partner and third-round leader Cristie Kerr, who was chasing a second Open title but carded a 75 (+4) and finished two strokes back.

Past champions in the field

Made the cut

Missed the cut

Course layout
Old Course 

 Note: Holes 16–18 normally play as holes 10–12 for the members, while holes 10–15 normally play as holes 13–18, but they were re-routed for this championship.

Source:

Round summaries

First round
Thursday, July 9, 2009

Second round
Friday, July 10, 2009

72 players made the cut at 151 (+9) or better

Third round
Saturday, July 11, 2009

Final round
Sunday, July 12, 2009

Source:

Scorecard 
Final round

Cumulative tournament scores, relative to par
Source:

References

External links

Saucon Valley Country Club

U.S. Women's Open
Golf in Pennsylvania
Sports competitions in Pennsylvania
Sports in Bethlehem, Pennsylvania
Women's sports in Pennsylvania
U.S. Women's Open
U.S. Women's Open
U.S. Women's Open
U.S. Women's Open